Jorge de León (born 1976) is a Guatemalan performance artist who specializes in body art and art object. He was born in Guatemala City, and forms part of the post-war generation of artists that includes Regina José Galindo and Anibal López. His work is extremely influenced by his past as a gang-banger. Before he became an artist Jorge was in and out of jail twelve times, and now looked to art as a means of confronting the gang violence rampant in Guatemala. His work is extremely political and seeks to question the dynamics of power in one of the countries in Latin America that has been more affected by extreme inequality, violence, and political corruption.

Artwork 

De León’s work centers on urban violence in Guatemala City, which is influenced by his former involvement in gangs. De León has commented that the rich live by double standards, “they are thieves, but they kill us saying we are thieves... At least gang members are honest. If (they) rob, they say it. If they take drugs they say it.” Although his work centers the use of the body, De León also explores art object and urban interventions.

Notes

References 
 Pagina de Literatura Guatemalteca 
 Leyva, Gabriel: “Una mirada crítica ante la discriminación de los pueblos latinoamericanos”. CONACULTA, Sala de Prensa, septiembre 6, 2001. 
 Leyva, Gabriel: “La marginalidad y el rezago social en América Latina, tema de la muestra interdisciplinaria Syo/Ajeno y Ajeno/Suyo”. CONACULTA, Sala de Prensa, agosto 31, 2001. 
 Cazali, Rosina. Pasos a Desnivel: mapa  urbano de la cultura contemporanea en Guatemala. HIVOS & laCuranderia. Guatemala City, 2003.

Living people
1976 births
People from Guatemala City
Guatemalan artists
Performance artists
Guatemalan contemporary artists